Aïssatou Tounkara (born 16 March 1995) is a French professional footballer who plays as a defender for Women's Super League club Manchester United and the France national team.

Club career

Tounkara started her career at the Buttes Chaumont FC club, where she stayed until the fall of 2008 when she joined the Football Féminin Issy-les-Moulineaux, whose team was then in Division 2 Féminine. In the offseason of 2010, Tounkara joined FCF Juvisy in the Division 1 Féminine.

On 10 August 2022, Tounkara joined English Women's Super League side Manchester United on a two-year contract.

International career

Youth
She was part of several French youth teams. She debuted for the France U16 team against Norway on 4 July 2011. Tounkara also represented France in many international competitions. In 2012, she was part of the squad that played at the UEFA Women's Under-17 Championship, in which France finished second. In September of the same year, she was called to represent France at the 2012 FIFA U-17 Women's World Cup in Azerbaijan. Tounkara was a titular along the whole tournament and played the final match in which France defeated North Korea on penalties and became champions. In August 2013, Tounkara traveled to Wales to represent France U19 at the 2013 UEFA Women's Under-19 Championship. The team did very well, defeating England in the great final and taking the title. In August 2014, Tounkara was called to represent France U20 at the 2014 FIFA U-20 Women's World Cup in Canada. The French team finished third.

Senior
In 2017, she was part of the squad that represented France at the UEFA Women's Euro 2017. She also featured for France at the 2022 UEFA Women's Euro where France reached the semi-finals after being eliminated by Germany.

Personal life
Born in France, Tounkara is of Gambian descent.

Career statistics

Club
.

International

Scores and results list France's goal tally first, score column indicates score after each Tounkara goal.

Honours 
Atlético Madrid Primera División Femenina: 2018–19
 Supercopa de Espana: 2020–21France U17 UEFA Women's Under-17 Championship runner-up: 2012
 FIFA U-17 Women's World Cup: 2012France U19 UEFA Women's Under-19 Championship: 2013France'''

 SheBelieves Cup: 2017
 Tournoi de France: 2020

Notes

References

External links
 
 
 
 
 
 Player's Profile at Foot o Feminin
 Player's Profile at Paris FC

1995 births
Living people
Footballers from Paris
French women's footballers
Women's association football defenders
France women's youth international footballers
France women's international footballers
2019 FIFA Women's World Cup players
Division 1 Féminine players
Paris FC (women) players
Primera División (women) players
Atlético Madrid Femenino players
Manchester United W.F.C. players
French expatriate women's footballers
French expatriate sportspeople in Spain
Expatriate women's footballers in Spain
French expatriate sportspeople in England
Expatriate women's footballers in England
Black French sportspeople
French people of Gambian descent
UEFA Women's Euro 2022 players
UEFA Women's Euro 2017 players